Harvey Bischop (born 8 July 1982 in The Hague) is a Dutch retired professional footballer who works as physiotherapist at Cambuur.

Club career
Bischop played for Eerste Divisie clubs Cambuur and FC Zwolle during the 2002-2007 football seasons. He also had a spell in Belgium with Dessel Sport.

He later played for amateur sides Sneek Zwart Wit, Be Quick '28 and Harkemase Boys.

He joined Drachtster Boys in 2014, while operating his own physiotherapy business in Leeuwarden.

References

External links
Voetbal International profile

1982 births
Living people
Footballers from The Hague
Association football defenders
Dutch footballers
SC Cambuur players
PEC Zwolle players
K.F.C. Dessel Sport players
Eerste Divisie players
Dutch expatriate footballers
Expatriate footballers in Belgium
Dutch expatriate sportspeople in Belgium
Be Quick '28 players
Harkemase Boys players